Jarre (French: [ʒaʁ]) is a French surname that may refer to the following notable people:

Cyrillus Jarre (1878–1952), Franciscan Archbishop in Jinan, China
 Jean-Michel Jarre (born 1948), composer of electronic and new age music, son of Maurice
 4422 Jarre, an asteroid named in honor of both Maurice and Jean-Michel Jarre
Jérôme Jarre, French entrepreneur
 Maurice Jarre (1924–2009), film score composer
 Kevin Jarre (1954–2011), American screenwriter, stepbrother of Jean-Michel Jarre

French-language surnames